Joseph "Jeff" Moureau (13 April 1921 – 28 October 2020) was a Belgian fighter pilot of the 349th (Belgian) Squadron belonging to the Royal Air Force during World War II.

Life 
A few days after the German invasion in Belgium, in 1940, he fled, together with his twin brother, to England. A few months after their arrival in England both brothers joined the British air force, applying to be pilots. After an intense training both were assigned as spitfire fighter pilots in the 349th RAF squadron that was mainly formed by Belgian personnel. During his stay in this squadron Moureau had a severe accident, but he returned to his unit (without a medical clearance) right in time for D-Day. During D-Day, Operation Overlord, on 6 June 1944, Moureau shot down a German Junker Ju 88 bomber.

After World War II he became a civilian airline pilot and flew for over 30 years with different airplanes for, Sobelair and later Sabena. 
He was the last living Belgian pilot that was active on D-Day. He died in 2020 aged 99.

References

External links 
 Interview Jeff Moureau – operation Overlord
 Interview with Joseph Moureau

Belgian World War II pilots
Belgian Royal Air Force personnel of World War II
1921 births
2020 deaths